The Astonishing Spider-Man was a comic book series published fortnightly in the United Kingdom by Panini Comics as part of Marvel UK's 'Collectors Edition' line. It reprinted selected Spider-Man stories and material from the American comic books.

Format
The current format is 76 pages, with three stories being printed every issue. Whilst it usually prints more modern story lines, ‘classic' tales are also used as back-up strips. The inside front cover of the comic contains a message from the editor as well as a ‘Story So Far’ section to allow lapsed readers to catch up. At the back of the comic is a letter’s page (Web-Mail) whereby readers can write in and give their views and opinions on the stories. The letters page also previously included short comic strips entitled ‘Mini-Marvels’, initially reprints of Chris Giarrusso's & Lew Stringer’s work.
A subscription is also available.

Publication history
With Panini Comics having obtained the licence to reprint Marvel comics internationally, Astonishing Spider-Man began publication in November 1995. 150 issues were published in the first volume before the title was re-launched in 2007 to mark its change from a four-weekly publishing schedule to a two-weekly one. Volume 2 ran for two years before it was re-launched again in December 2009 to mark the start of the "Brand New Day" storyline. Volume 4 launched in October 2013 as the Superior Spider-Man run of stories began in the title. Volume 7 is ongoing.

Printed material

Volume 5 (2014–2016)
"Spider-Verse"
"Secret Wars"

Volume 6 (2016–2018)
Amazing Spider-Man Vol. 4
Spider-Man/Deadpool Vol. 1
Amazing Spider-Man: Renew Your Vows Vol. 2
Peter Parker: The Spectacular Spider-Man Vol. 1
Amazing Spider-Man: Family Business Original Graphic Novel
Spider-Man Vol. 2 (Miles Morales)
Spider-Gwen Vol. 2
Prowler Vol. 2
Clone Conspiracy Vol. 1/Omega
Free Comic Book Day 2017 Captain America
Civil War II: Amazing Spider-Man
Spidey Vol. 1
Spider-Man & The X-Men Vol. 1
Amazing Spider-Man Vol. 1 #148 - #152 was also published.

Volume 7 (2018–2020)
Issue 1: 100-PAGE-SPECIAL!
Amazing Spider-Man #789
Venom Vol. 3 #1
Amazing Spider-Man: Renew Your Vows #13 - #15
Release: 10 May 2018

Issue 2:
Amazing Spider-Man #790
Venom Vol. 3 #2 - #3
Amazing Spider-Man: Renew Your Vows #15
Release: 24 May 2018

Issue 3:
Amazing Spider-Man #791
Venom Vol. 3 #4 - #6
Release: 7 June 2018

Issue 4:
Spider-Men II #1
Venom Vol. 3 #6
Venom #150 - #151
Release: 21 June 2018

Issue 5:
Spider-Men II #2
Venom #152 - #153, #150
Release: 5 July 2018

Issue 6:
Spider-Men II #3
Venom #153 - #154, #150
Release: 19 July 2018

See also
 The Amazing Spider-Man
 List of Spider-Man titles
 Spider-Man
 Panini Comics

References

External links
Panini’s Astonishing Spider-Man mini site
Panini Comic’s home page
Grand Comics Database

Spider-Man titles
1995 comics debuts
Marvel UK titles